The World Federation of Workers in Food, Drink, Tobacco and Hotel Industries (FMATH) was a global union federation bringing together unions representing workers in food and service industries.

The federation was established on 10 October 1948 at a meeting in Marche-en-Famenne.  Initially named the International Christian Federation of Food, Drink, Tobacco and Hotel Workers, the federation was a merger of the International Federation of Christian Trade Unions of Workers in the Food and Drink Trades, the International Federation of Christian Tobacco Workers, and a federation of Christian hotel workers.  Like its predecessors, it affiliated to the International Federation of Christian Trade Unions.

By 1979, the federation's affiliates claimed a total of 250,000 members.  In 1982, it merged with the World Federation of Agricultural Workers, to form the World Federation of Agriculture and Food Workers.

References

Food processing trade unions
Global union federations
World Confederation of Labour
Trade unions established in 1948
Trade unions disestablished in 1982